Max Stern may refer to:
 Max Emanuel Stern (1811–1873), writer, poet and translator 
 Max Stern (gallery owner) (1904–1987), German-Canadian arts benefactor, art historian and gallery owner
 Max Stern (businessman) (1898–1982), entrepreneur who established and built the Hartz Mountain Corporation
 Max Stern (poker player), professional poker player, pediatrician and author
 Max Stern (composer) (born 1947), composer, double-bassist and conductor